Seton Keough High School was an all-girls college preparatory private, Roman Catholic high school in Baltimore, Maryland. It is located in the Roman Catholic Archdiocese of Baltimore, at 1201 Caton Avenue. It was founded in 1988 after the joining of the two schools, Archbishop Keough and Seton High School. In 2016 the Archdiocese of Baltimore confirmed that settlements had been paid to past students of the school who were sexually abused by Father Joseph Maskell, a priest and counsellor at the school from 1967 to 1975. The school closed in June 2017.

Sexual abuse
In 2016, the Archdiocese of Baltimore confirmed that settlements totaling $472,000 had been paid to 16 past students of the school who were sexually abused by Father Joseph Maskell, a priest at the school from 1967 to 1975. 

In 1969, a popular English and drama teacher at Archbishop Keough, Sister Cathy Cesnik, was found murdered in the outskirts of the city of Baltimore. Her murder was never solved and is the central subject of the 2017 Netflix documentary web series The Keepers. The abuses by priests at the school were also featured in the documentary in relation to the potential cover-up of the murder of Cesnik, who shortly before her death had been told by female students of the abuse. The documentary cited that over a hundred former students came forward to provide testimony on rape, sexual misconduct, and molestation.

Closure

On October 26, 2016, the Archdiocese of Baltimore announced that the school would close in June 2017. The decision was reached as a result of an 18-month study of 22 Catholic schools in and around Baltimore. Conducted by consulting firms Ayers Saint Gross, DataStory and Fielding Nair International, the study examined school facilities, enrollment, and projected demographic data and potential areas of growth. The study identified three schools for closure due to under-enrollment and/or facility condition, including Seton Keough.

Notable alumnae 

Theresa Andrews, Olympic swimmer 
Elizabeth Bobo, former Howard County executive, member of the Maryland House of Delegates
Asya Bussie, professional basketball player for Minnesota Lynx

See also

National Catholic Educational Association

References

External links
 Roman Catholic Archdiocese of Baltimore
 School website

1988 establishments in Maryland
Catholic secondary schools in Maryland
Defunct high schools in Maryland
Educational institutions established in 1988
Girls' schools in Maryland
Private schools in Baltimore
School sexual abuse scandals
Violetville, Baltimore
Educational institutions disestablished in 2017
2017 disestablishments in Maryland